Jean Joseph Beaufort, (1832 – September 15, 1897) known also as John Joseph Beaufort, was a corporal in the Union Army who was awarded a Medal of Honor for heroic actions during the American Civil War.

Early life
Beaufort was born in 1832 in France. He later immigrated to the United States.

Later life
Beaufort was living in New Orleans, Louisiana when the Civil War broke out. After the Union captured New Orleans, Beaufort volunteered for service in the Union army, joining the 2nd Louisiana Regiment Infantry at around May 20, 1863.

When the 2nd Louisiana Infantry approached Port Hudson, Beaufort volunteered to take a party of eight people behind enemy lines to destroy a signal station; he succeeded, giving the Union a key advantage in the impending Siege of Port Hudson.

Thirty four years later, Beaufort was awarded the Medal of Honor for leading the assault on the signal station. He died some two months later on September 15, 1897, and was buried at Arlington National Cemetery, in Arlington, Virginia.

See also

 List of Medal of Honor recipients

References

External links

 Arlington National Cemetery
 

1832 births
1897 deaths
French emigrants to the United States
Union Army soldiers
People of Louisiana in the American Civil War
United States Army Medal of Honor recipients
French-born Medal of Honor recipients
Burials at Arlington National Cemetery
American Civil War recipients of the Medal of Honor